USS Flicker (AMS-9/YMS-219) was a  acquired by the U.S. Navy for clearing coastal minefields during World War II.

Flicker was laid down 23 October 1942 by the J. N. Martinac Shipbuilding Co., Tacoma, Washington; launched, 23 January 1943; completed, 20 July 1943; commissioned USS YMS-219; named Flicker and reclassified as a motor minesweeper, AMS-9, 17 February 1947; Reclassified as a coastal minesweeper (Old), MSC(O)-9, 7 February 1955.

Flicker was decommissioned in September/October 1953 at Naval Station, Astoria, Oregon. She was struck from the Naval Register, 1 January 1960. Her fate is unknown.

References

External links 
 

YMS-1-class minesweepers of the United States Navy
Ships built in Tacoma, Washington
1943 ships
World War II minesweepers of the United States